Pezzati is an Italian surname. Notable people with the surname include:

Carlo Pezzati, mayor of Picenza, Italy
Jeff Pezzati, American punk rock musician
Mary Pezzati, mother of one of Bob Dylan's early girlfriends Suze Rotolo]
Pietro Pezzati (artist), Italian religious painter
Peter S. Pezzati, known as Pietro Pezzati, was an American portrait painter

Italian-language surnames